The River class was a class of 151 frigates launched between 1941 and 1944 for use as anti-submarine convoy escorts in the North Atlantic. The majority served with the Royal Navy and Royal Canadian Navy (RCN), with some serving in the other Allied navies: the Royal Australian Navy (RAN), the Free French Naval Forces, the Royal Netherlands Navy and, post-war, the South African Navy.

The first orders were placed by the Royal Navy in 1940, and the vessels were named for rivers in the United Kingdom, giving name to the class. In Canada, they were named for towns and cities, though they kept the same designation. Originally called a "twin-screw corvette", the name "frigate" was suggested by Vice-Admiral Percy W. Nelles of the Royal Canadian Navy. Canada originally ordered the construction of 33 frigates in October 1941. The design was too big for the locks on the Lachine Canal so it was not built by the shipyards on the Great Lakes and therefore all the frigates built in Canada were built in dockyards along the West Coast or along the St. Lawrence River below Montreal. In all, Canada ordered the construction of 70 frigates, including ten for the Royal Navy, which transferred two to the United States Navy. Twelve were built in Australia for the RAN (four to a modified design).

After World War II, they found employment in many other navies the world over; several RCN ships were sunk as breakwaters. One, was purchased by Aristotle Onassis and converted into the luxury yacht .

Design

The River-class ships were designed by naval engineer William Reed, of Smith's Dock Company of South Bank-on-Tees, to have the endurance and anti-submarine capabilities of the  sloops, while being quick and cheap to build in civil dockyards using the machinery (e.g. reciprocating steam engines instead of turbines) and construction techniques pioneered in the building of the s. Its purpose was to improve on the convoy escort classes in service with the Royal Navy, including the Flower class.

Improvements over the corvette design included markedly better accommodation. Among other lessons applied to the design was armament better designed to combat U-boats, including a twin  mount forward and 12-pounder aft. For underwater targets, it was equipped with a Hedgehog anti-submarine mortar with depth charge rails and four side-mounted throwers aft for a 10-charge pattern (some had 8 throwers for a 14-charge pattern for a brief period until this was abandoned).

River-class frigates were the first Royal Canadian Navy warships to carry the 147B Sword horizontal fan-beam active sonar transmitter, in addition to the regular ASDIC. This allowed the ship to maintain contact with targets even while firing, unless a target was struck. Better radar and radio direction-finding equipment improved the RCN's ability to find and track enemy submarines over previous classes.

Ships in class

Two hundred and forty-three frigates were built in Britain, Canada and Australia for seven navies during World War II.

Vessels lost in action

Survivors

 served as a convoy escort during the Battle of the Atlantic and was present at the D-Day landings. In 1947, Greek shipowner Aristotle Onassis purchased her for scrap value and converted her into a luxurious superyacht named Christina O, after his daughter. The vessel is now owned by John Paul Nicolaou, who lets the yacht for elite charters and cruises.

, formerly  served as a convoy escort during World War II and later transferred to the Israeli Navy and then the Royal Ceylon Navy, which later became the Sri Lankan Navy. She was withdrawn from active duty in 1980 and is now used as a training ship by Sri Lanka.

, formerly , is preserved in Seikkyi, Myanmar.

In fiction 
"HMS Saltash" was a fictional River class frigate in Nicholas Monsarrat's 1951 book The Cruel Sea. (In the 1953 Jack Hawkins film version she is called "HMS Saltash Castle", and was played by the corvette .)

 played the fictional frigate "HMS Rockhampton" in the 1955 John Wayne film The Sea Chase. (She had just been recommissioned as a Prestonian class upgrade of the Canadian River-class frigate, after ten years in reserve.)

"HMS Nairn" was a fictional River-class frigate in Alistair MacLean's 1955 book HMS Ulysses.

See also
List of Escorteurs of the French Navy

References

Bibliography

External links

Convoy escort movements for River-class frigates

Frigate classes
North Atlantic convoys of World War II
 
Ship classes of the Royal Navy
Battle of the Atlantic
 
Ship classes of the French Navy